Jennifer Lim (born 18 November 1985) is a Singaporean actress based in the U.K.

Life and career 
Lim is known for her appearance as Samantha in the first television show made especially for mobile phones, called When Evil Calls directed by Johannes Roberts and for her role as Kana in the 2005 horror film Hostel.

In the short film, Isolation 9, written and directed by Jo Ho, Lim portrays Amy, a sick teenager. She is in hospital isolation, and develops a fragile relationship with a custodian. In 2015, she starred in Timo Rose's Sasquatch series Nature.

Filmography

References

External links

1980 births
British film actresses
Place of birth missing (living people)
British actresses of Chinese descent
Living people